California Conference is one of the three conferences of the CIF Northern Section, a high school athletics governing body part of the California Interscholastic Federation. The conference is divided into several leagues.

Member Schools

 American Christian High School
 Big Valley High School
 Butte Valley High School
 Champion Christian High School
 Core Butte High School
 Downieville High School
 Dunsmuir High School
 Elk Creek High School
 Golden Eagle Charter High School
 Greenville Junior Senior High School
 Happy Camp High School
 Hayfork High School
 Herlong High School
 Loyalton High School
 Westwood High School
 Paradise Adventist High School
 Providence Christian High School
 Surprise Valley High School
 Tulelake High School
 Plumas Christian High School
 Princeton Junior Senior High School

References

CIF Northern section